Stanfield may refer to:

People
 Stanfield (surname)

Places

United Kingdom
 Stanfield, Norfolk

United States
 Stanfield, Arizona
 Stanfield, Norfolk
 Stanfield, North Carolina
 Stanfield, Oregon
 Stanfield, Texas

 Stanfield Secondary School, Stanfield, Oregon
 Stanfield-Worley Bluff Shelter, prehistoric Paleo-Indian site, Alabama

Other uses
 Murders at Stanfield Hall, notorious English Victorian era double murder in 1848
 Stanfield, 1968 film directed by Donald Shebib
 Stanfield's Limited, Canadian garment manufacturer
 Gordon Stanfield Animation, Canadian animation service and creator company

See also
Stainfield, two villages in Lincolnshire, England
Stansfield (disambiguation)
Halifax Stanfield International Airport, the alternate name for Halifax Robert L. Stanfield International Airport